The United States District Court for the District of Rhode Island (in case citations, D.R.I.) is the federal district court whose jurisdiction is the state of Rhode Island. The District Court was created in 1790 when Rhode Island ratified the Constitution. The Federal Courthouse was built in 1908.

Appeals from the District of Rhode Island are taken to the United States Court of Appeals for the First Circuit (except for patent claims and claims against the U.S. government under the Tucker Act, which are appealed to the Federal Circuit).

The United States Attorney for the District of Rhode Island represents the United States in civil and criminal litigation in the court.  the United States Attorney is Zachary A. Cunha.

Legislative history 
Congress authorized one judgeship for the Court, and assigned the district to the Eastern Circuit. On February 13, 1801, the outgoing lame duck Federalist-controlled Congress passed the controversial Judiciary Act of 1801 which reassigned the District of Rhode Island to the First Circuit.

The incoming Congress repealed the Judiciary Act of 1801, but in the Judiciary Act of 1802, Congress again assigned the District of Rhode Island to the First Circuit.

Current judges 
:

Former judges

Chief judges

Succession of seats

Notable cases 
 West v. Barnes (1791), the first case appealed to the U.S. Supreme Court
 Fricke v. Lynch (1980), case involving government gender limits on prom dates
 Lee v. Weisman (1992), case involving clergy-led prayer at public school graduation ceremonies

United States Attorney for the District of Rhode Island
Some of the US Attorneys for Rhode Island
David Leonard Barnes (1797–1801)
Asher Robbins (1812–1820)
Dutee Jerauld Pearce (1824–1825)
George H. Browne (1852–1861)
Wingate Hayes (1861–1871)
Nathan F. Dixon III (1877–1885)
Walter Russell Stiness (1911–1914)
Norman S. Case (1921–1926)
John S. Murdock (1926–1929)
Henry Boss (1929–1934)
J. Howard McGrath (1934–1940)
George Troy (1940–1952)
Edward McEntee (1952–1953)
Raymond James Pettine (1961–1966) 
Edward P. Gallogly (1967–1969)
Lincoln Almond (1969–1978) 
Paul F. Murray (1978–1981) 
Lincoln Almond (1981–1993)
Sheldon Whitehouse (1993–1998)
Margaret E. Curran (1998–2003)
Robert Clark Corrente (2004–2009)
Peter Neronha (2009–2017)
Aaron L. Weisman (2019–2021)
Richard B. Myrus (acting) (2021–present)

See also 
 Courts of Rhode Island
 List of current United States district judges
 List of United States federal courthouses in Rhode Island

References

External links 
 United States District Court for the District of Rhode Island Official Website
 United States Attorney for the District of Rhode Island Official Website

Rhode Island
Rhode Island law
Providence, Rhode Island
1790 establishments in the United States
Courthouses in Rhode Island
Courts and tribunals established in 1790